The Hillsborough Convention, was the first of two North Carolina conventions to ratify the United States Constitution. Delegates represented 7 boroughs and 59 counties, including six western counties that became part of Tennessee when it was created in 1796. They met in Hillsborough, North Carolina from July 21 to August 4, 1788 to deliberate and determine whether to ratify the Constitution recommended to the states by the General Convention that had been held in Philadelphia the previous summer. The delegates had won their seats through special elections held in March 1788, as mandated by the North Carolina General Assembly. Governor Samuel Johnston presided over the Convention.  The Hillsborough Convention was dominated by anti-Federalists, and North Carolina did not ratify the Constitution until the Fayetteville Convention, which met a year later.

Location 
The convention was held in Hillsborough, North Carolina, at the St. Matthew's Episcopal (Church of England) Church.  The church was located on lot 98 in Hillsborough. It was also the location of the third Provincial Congress of North Carolina of 1775 and the meeting place of the North Carolina Legislature in 1778, 1782 and 1783. The church was destroyed by fire before 1800s. A new structure was built on the site in 1814 and became the Hillsborough Presbyterian Church in 1816.

Division 
Key state Federalists were James Iredell Sr., William Richardson Davie, and William Blount. Anti-Federalist leaders included Willie Jones, Samuel Spencer, and Timothy Bloodworth. The Anti-Federalist delegates outnumbered their Federalist colleagues by a margin of two to one. The Federalists wanted to strengthen the powers of the federal government to help the country keep from dissolving. They argued that the powers granted to the federal government in the Articles of Confederation were not sufficient. On the other side, the Anti-Federalists were suspicious of the federal government and did not want self-rule to come under fire from a government that could intrude on state and individual rights. Knowing that they would likely lose, members of the Federalist minority brought a stenographer to the convention to record their arguments for publication in the hopes of changing public opinion in the future.

Outcome
The debate resulted in the delegates voting 184 to 84 to neither ratify nor reject the Constitution. One of the major reasons for North Carolina not ratifying the Constitution was its lack of a Bill of Rights. The delegates, however, proposed a series of amendments to personal liberties and urged the new federal Congress to adopt measures to incorporate a bill of rights into the Constitution. North Carolina would not join the Union until after it ratified the Constitution, more than a year later, at the November 1789 Fayetteville Convention.

Delegates

 

There were 294 known delegates from the 59 counties and seven boroughs of North Carolina. Some counties (Greene, Sullivan, Sumner, Tennessee, Washington) later became part of the state of Tennessee in 1796. The election of delegates from Dobbs County was declared invalid because of violence that led to the loss of the ballot box.

Governor Samuel Johnston was the President of the Convention.  While his home was in Chowan County, he represented Perquimans County in the Convention. John Hunt was the secretary and James Taylor was the assistant secretary of the Convention.  The doorkeepers of the convention were William Murfree, Peter Gooding, Nicholas Murfree, and James Mulloy.

See also

 Fayetteville Convention
 History of the United States Constitution
 Scene at the Signing of the Constitution of the United States, 1940 painting by Howard Chandler Christy, shows Richard Dobbs Spaight, William Blount, and Hugh Williamson of North Carolina at center stage
 Timeline of drafting and ratification of the United States Constitution

References

Additional sourcing:

External links
North Carolina. Convention (1788) "Proceedings and Debates of the Convention of North-Carolina, Convened at Hillsborough, ..", Documenting the American South (DocSouth), a digital publishing initiative sponsored by the University Library at the University of North Carolina at Chapel Hill

1788 in the United States
1788 in North Carolina
History of North Carolina
Ratification of the United States Constitution
1788 in American politics